Pari is one of 96 districts in the city of São Paulo, Brazil. Administratively part of the Southeast Zone of São Paulo, Pari is located immediately to the east of the historic downtown in the Subprefecture of Mooca.

References

Districts of São Paulo